Circle packing in an equilateral triangle is a packing problem in discrete mathematics where the objective is to pack  unit circles into the smallest possible equilateral triangle.

Minimum solutions for the side length of the triangle:

A closely related problem is to cover the equilateral triangle with a fixed number of equal circles, having as small a radius as possible.

See also
Circle packing in an isosceles right triangle
Malfatti circles, a construction giving the optimal solution for three circles in an equilateral triangle

References

Circle packing